The Battle of Moscow was a series of two battles, which took place in Moscow, on September 1 and 3, 1612, during the Polish–Muscovite War (1605–18), and Time of Troubles. Forces of the Polish–Lithuanian Commonwealth were commanded by Field Hetman of Lithuania, Jan Karol Chodkiewicz, while the Russians were led by Dmitry Pozharsky. The battles ended in tactical Russian victory.

Prelude 
After the Battle of Klushino in summer of 1610, Tsar Vasili IV of Russia was deposed and taken to Warsaw. The Polish-Lithuanian army entered Moscow on September 21, 1610, and the boyars, clergy, and citizens of Moscow, in fear of False Dmitry II, accepted the Polish Prince Wladyslaw IV Vasa as new Tsar.

But the foreign Tsar was not universally accepted outside Moscow, and the country was ransacked by Poles, mercenaries, and gangs of robbers of every nation.

In March 1611, citizens of Moscow rebelled against the Poles, and the Polish garrison was besieged in Kremlin by the First People's Militia, led by Prokopy Lyapunov, a Ryazan-born noble. Poorly armed militia failed to take the fortress, and soon fell into disorder: Lyapunov was murdered by Cossack leader Ivan Zarutski.

Amidst anarchy and breakdown of central government, citizens of Nizhny Novgorod led by Kuzma Minin assembled the Second People's Militia, under the command of Prince Dmitry Pozharsky. Well-armed and organized, the Second People's Militia took Yaroslavl in March of 1612 and set up a provisional government of all Russia, getting support and provisions from many cities of Russia and Siberia. Getting news  that a Polish relief army under Hetman Chodkiewicz was approaching Moscow, Minin and Pozharsky entered Moscow in August 1612 and besieged the Polish garrison in the Kremlin.

First Battle 
On September 1, 1612, Polish–Lithuanian forces unsuccessfully tried to break the siege of the Moscow Kremlin, and rescue the Commonwealth garrison under Mikołaj Struś which was present there. To achieve this, they attacked from the west, towards the suburbs of Moscow. Polish hussars, backed by Polish, Hungarian, and German infantry, managed to break the Russian lines. At the same time, however, the right wing of the Commonwealth forces was exposed, which was immediately noticed by the Don Cossacks (allied with the Russians) of Dmitry Troubetskoy, who awaited the outcome of the battle on the other bank of the Moscow River. Part of their cavalry attacked together with forces Pozharsky sent to Trubetskoy’s aid beforehand, managing to disperse the Polish–Lithuanian forces. At the same time, the Commonwealth units in the Kremlin tried to attack the Russian positions, but also failed. On this day, both sides lost some 1000 men.

Second Battle 
On September 3 Chodkiewicz decided to attack Moscow via its southern suburb, the Zamoskvorechye District. Some 600 Hungarian infantrymen managed to reach the walls of the Kremlin. They were followed by main Commonwealth units, which however were halted in the narrow streets of the district. After a Russian counterattack, Chodkiewicz ordered a retreat, losing several hundred men.

Outcome 
According to Dunning, "On October 26, Mstislavskii...led Ivan Romanov, Mikhail Romanov, and other sheepish aristocrats out of the Kremlin. The next day, October 27, the Polish garrison surrendered unconditionally, and national militia forces entered the capital."

Sources 

 Andrzej Andrusiewicz, Dzieje Dymitriad 1602–1614, t. I, II, Warszawa 1990 
 Tomasz Bohun, Moskwa 1612, Wydawnictwo Bellona 2005

References 

Moscow 1612
Moscow (1612)
1612 in Europe
17th century in Moscow
Moscow (1612)
Moscow (1612)
1612 in Russia
Moscow 1612